Events from the year 1878 in Denmark.

Incumbents
 Monarch – Christian IX
 Prime minister – J. B. S. Estrup

Events

 9 May  The panserbatteri Helgoland is launched.
 21 December  Princess Thyra of Denmark is wed to Ernest Augustus, Crown Prince of Hanover in Copenhagen. The couple continues to Fredensborg Palace after the wedding ceremony.

Births
 13 March – Lau Lauritzen Sr., film director, screenwriter and actor (died 1938)
 11 April – Holger-Madsen, actor (died 1943)
 2 August – Princess Ingeborg of Denmark, duchess of Västergötland (died 1958 in Sweden)
 24 December – Thomas Madsen-Mygdal, politician, former Danish prime minister (died 1943)

Deaths

References

 
1870s in Denmark
Denmark
Years of the 19th century in Denmark